Bayard Dodge (1888–1972) was an American scholar of Islam and president of the American University in Beirut.

Background

The son of Cleveland Hoadley Dodge and Grace Wainwright Parish, he graduated from Princeton University in 1909.

Career

In 1923 Dodge succeed his father-in-law, Howard Bliss, to become the president of a university in Beirut then known as the Syrian Protestant College. His great uncle, Reverend David Stuart Dodge, had been one of the first professors to teach at the faculty in the 1860s. Dorothy Rowntree, the first woman engineering graduate from the University of Glasgow, worked as Bayard Dodge's personal assistant at the university in Beirut.

After his retirement from the presidency in 1948 he continued teaching at several universities. His son, David S. Dodge, later served the same role.

Works

Aspects of the Fatimid Philosophy, The Muslim World, L, No.3 (Jul, 1960)
Al-Azhar Mosque: A Millennium of Muslim Learning. Washington, Middle East Institute (1961) - a comprehensive history of the world famous university mosque of Cairo.
The Fatimid Hierarchy and Exegesis, The Muslim World, L, No.2 (Apr, 1960), pp. 130–41
The Fatimid Legal Code, ibid., L, No.1 (Jan 1960), pp. 30–38
Al-Isma'iliyah and the Origin of the Fatimids, ibid, XLIX, No.4 (Oct 1959), pp. 295–305
Muslim Education in Medieval Times, Washington, Middle East Institute, 1962
The Sabians of Harran in Sarruf, ed., American University of Beirut Festival Book: Festschrift, pp. 60–85.
The Fihrist of al-Nadīm: A Tenth-Century Survey of Islamic Culture. An English translation of the 10th-century Arabic encyclopedia by the Baghdadī bibliophile, Ibn Ishāq al-Nadīm.

See also
 William E. Dodge
 William E. Dodge Jr.
 Cleveland Hoadley Dodge
 David S. Dodge

References

American scholars of Islam
Scholars of medieval Islamic history
American orientalists
American Arabists
Arabic–English translators
Historians of the Middle East
Dodge family
Academic staff of the American University of Beirut
1972 deaths
1888 births
20th-century translators